Infanta Luisa Teresa of Spain (11 June 1824 - 27 December 1900) was a Spanish infanta.

She was the daughter of Infante Francisco de Paula of Spain and Princess Luisa Carlotta of the Two Sicilies and married the Spanish aristocrat Don José María Osorio de Moscoso y Carvajal, Duke of Sessa in 1847. She was an intimate friend and favorite of her cousin and sister-in-law Queen Isabella II, who allowed her marriage despite the unprecedented unequal rank.

Ancestry

References 

1824 births
1900 deaths
Spanish princesses
Burials in the Pantheon of Infantes at El Escorial